Christopher Henderson Clark (1767 – November 21, 1828) was a congressman and lawyer from Virginia. He was the brother of James Clark, the uncle of John Bullock Clark, Sr. and the great-uncle of John Bullock Clark, Jr.

Biography
Born in Albemarle County, Virginia, Clark attended Washington College, studied law in the office of Patrick Henry and was admitted to the bar in 1788, commencing practice in New London, Campbell County, Virginia. He was a member of the Virginia House of Delegates in 1790 and was elected a Democratic-Republican to the United States House of Representatives to fill a vacancy in 1804, serving until his resignation in 1806. He resumed practicing law until his death near New London on November 21, 1828. He was interred at a private cemetery at Old Lawyers Station near Lynchburg, Virginia.

External links

1767 births
1828 deaths
Members of the Virginia House of Delegates
Virginia lawyers
Democratic-Republican Party members of the United States House of Representatives from Virginia
Virginia colonial people
People from Albemarle County, Virginia
Burials in Virginia
19th-century American lawyers